David Cole or Dave Cole may refer to:
 David L. Cole (1902–1978), American labor mediator
 David Cole (1928–2003), Welsh journalist, later editor and chairman of the Western Mail
 Dave Cole (baseball) (1930–2011), American baseball player
 David Cole (diplomat), British diplomat
 David C. Cole (born 1952), entrepreneur and philanthropist
 David D. Cole (born 1958), legal scholar and legal director of the ACLU
 David N. Cole (active since 1980), American music producer
 David Cole (journalist) (born 1968), American Holocaust denier and journalist
 David Cole (record producer) (1962–1995), American record producer, songwriter, one half of the duo C+C Music Factory
 David Cole (footballer) (born 1962), English footballer
 David Cole, badminton player that played in 1991 IBF World Championships – Men's singles
 Dave Cole (artist) (born 1975), American visual artist
 David R. Cole (active since 2004), senior lecturer at the University of Technology, Sydney

See also
 David Cole House (built 1890) in Portland, Oregon, USA
 David Cole Observatory (established 2007) in Massachusetts, USA
 David Coles (disambiguation)
 Cole (surname)